Stephen Giles (born July 4, 1972) is a Canadian sprint canoeist who competed from the early 1990s to the mid 2000s. Competing in four Summer Olympics, he won the bronze in the C-1 1000 m event at Sydney in 2000.

Life 
Giles was born in St. Stephen, New Brunswick.  He began canoeing at age eight at the Orenda Racing Canoe Club in Lake Echo, Nova Scotia.  He was a member of the Canadian national team for fifteen years, including eleven senior world championships.  He was inducted into the Nova Scotia Sport Hall of Fame in 2012.

He was adept at both the 500 m event and 1000 m early in his career. His best races came in the C-1 1000 m event later in his career, earning the world championship gold medal in 1998 at Szeged, Hungary. In the same event, he won a bronze medal at the 2000 Summer Olympics, and a bronze medal at the 2002 World Championships in Seville, Spain. He also won a bronze medal at the 1993 world championships in Copenhagen, Denmark, in the men's C-1 500 m event, and at the 1989 Junior World Championships in Dartmouth, Nova Scotia. Notable contemporaries in the C-1 included Andreas Dittmer, Martin Doktor, and Maxim Opalev.

Giles is part of a long line of successful Canadian paddlers in the C-1 discipline including Frank Amyot, John Wood, and Larry Cain.  Since Giles' retirement in 2004, the tradition has been taken up by fellow Nova Scotian Richard Dalton, Thomas Hall, and Mark Oldershaw.

Giles holds Bachelor of Science and Bachelor of Engineering degrees from Dalhousie University, as well as an honorary Doctor of Laws. He completed his Master of Business Administration degree at Saint Mary's University in 2011.  He currently works at EastLink in Halifax, Nova Scotia. He was married in 1997. He and wife Angela (née Julien) have a daughter, Macy, and a son, Duncan.

In 2018 he was named one of the greatest 15 athletes in Nova Scotia's history.

2004 Olympics
In the 2004 Summer Olympics, Giles competed in the C-1 1000 m event.  He finished second in his initial heat, advancing to the semifinal with a time of 3:52.451. Giles won his semifinal with a time of 3:51.720, qualifying for the final. There, he placed fifth at 3:51.457.

2009 ICF Canoe Sprint World Championships
For the 2009 ICF Canoe Sprint World Championships in neighboring Dartmouth, Giles served as Chair of Competition.

References

Committee chairs of the 2009 ICF Canoe Sprint World Championships in Dartmouth, Nova Scotia, Canada featuring Giles. - accessed January 4, 2009.

Sports-reference.com profile
Steve Giles, inductee in Nova Scotia Sport Hall of Fame

1972 births
Canadian male canoeists
Canadian engineers
Canadian people of English descent
Canoeists at the 1992 Summer Olympics
Canoeists at the 1996 Summer Olympics
Canoeists at the 2000 Summer Olympics
Canoeists at the 2004 Summer Olympics
Dalhousie University alumni
Living people
Sportspeople from New Brunswick
Olympic canoeists of Canada
People from St. Stephen, New Brunswick
Olympic medalists in canoeing
Medalists at the 2000 Summer Olympics
Olympic bronze medalists for Canada
Pan American Games medalists in canoeing
Pan American Games gold medalists for Canada
Pan American Games silver medalists for Canada
Canoeists at the 1999 Pan American Games
Medalists at the 1999 Pan American Games
Nova Scotia Sport Hall of Fame inductees